Anthony Derouard (born 14 May 1992) is a French footballer who plays as a forward for Sablé FC. 

He is a France youth international having earned caps at under-18 and under-19 level.

Career
Born in Sablé, Derouard made his professional debut with Le Mans on 21 December 2010 in a league match against Vannes appearing as a substitute in a 1–0 defeat.

In October 2013, he joined US Luzenac.

In September 2015, he joined CA Bastia.

In August 2017, Derouard was one of four new signings announced by SC Bastia, which had played in Ligue 1 in the 2016–17 season but dropped to the fifth-tier Championnat National 3 after filing bankruptcy. He joined from league rivals Sablé FC.

References

External links
 
 

1992 births
Living people
People from Sablé-sur-Sarthe
Association football forwards
French footballers
Le Mans FC players
Luzenac AP players
CA Bastia players
SC Bastia players
Ligue 2 players
Championnat National players
Championnat National 2 players
Championnat National 3 players
France youth international footballers
Sportspeople from Sarthe
Footballers from Pays de la Loire